Huvadhu Bas is a language/dialect of the Maldivian language spoken by the inhabitants of the large atoll of Huvadhu is one of the distinctive dialects of Maldivian language from Southern Maldives. Because of the isolation from the Northern Atolls, and the capital of Malé, Huvadhu Bas compared to other variants has many distinctive features. One of these feature is making use of the retroflex 'Ţ' as in Sinhalese instead of retroflex 'ṣ' used in northern variants.

In the past, there were frequent monthly trade relations between the ports of Huvadhu Atoll and the ports of Ceylon. As a result, there was great intercourse with the Sinhalese people from Ceylon and people from Huvadhu unlike that of other Maldivian atolls. Due to this Huvadhu bas has been influenced by the Sinhala language greater than other Maldivian dialects. Huvadhu Bas retains many old Sinhala words, and is linguistically closer to Sinhala than the other dialects of Maldivian.

Languages of the Maldives
Indo-Aryan languages
Maldivian language